Huntingdon station is an Amtrak railway station located at 4th and Allegheny Streets in Huntingdon, Pennsylvania, approximately 95 miles northwest of Harrisburg, Pennsylvania and 30 miles east of Altoona, Pennsylvania. The station is located at the south end of the borough, along one of the major streets into Huntingdon (4th Street), just north of the Juniata River.

The station was originally built by the Pennsylvania Railroad in 1872, and shared service with the Huntingdon and Broad Top Mountain Railroad, which had a station across the tracks. The station house was closed by PRR in 1965, and is currently a local business. It also contained a signal house, which for a time served as a rail museum but now houses the Huntingdon County Chamber of Commerce. Efforts to save the former H&BTM station failed when it was demolished in 2001.

Huntingdon is currently only served by Amtrak's Pennsylvanian, which operates once per day in each direction. Until 2005, Huntingdon was served by a second daily train, the Three Rivers (a replacement service for the legendary Broadway Limited), an extended version of the Pennsylvanian that terminated in Chicago. Upon its cancellation, the sole Pennsylvanian marked the first time in Huntingdon's railway history that the town was served by just a single, daily passenger train.

The station is actually a shack-like, but structurally sound building.  There is no ticket office at this station. Though most of the Pennsylvanian route between Harrisburg and Pittsburgh transverses through rural, sparsely populated areas, Huntingdon is the only stop between the two aforementioned cities that does not have bus service, either local or intercity, of any kind within one mile of the station.

References

External links 

Huntingdon Amtrak Station (USA RailGuide -- TrainWeb)

Amtrak stations in Pennsylvania
Stations on the Pittsburgh Line
Transportation buildings and structures in Huntingdon County, Pennsylvania
Huntingdon, Pennsylvania